Moonrise, Hernandez, New Mexico is a black-and-white photograph taken by Ansel Adams, late in the afternoon on November 1, 1941, from a shoulder of highway US 84 / US 285 in the unincorporated community of Hernandez, New Mexico.

The photograph shows the Moon rising in a dominating black sky above a collection of modest dwellings, a church and a cross-filled graveyard, with snow-covered mountains in the background. Adams captured a single image, with the sunset lighting the white crosses and buildings. Art historian H. W. Janson called the photograph "a perfect marriage of straight and pure photography".

The photograph became so popular and collectible that Adams personally made over 1,300 photographic prints of it during his career. The fame of the photograph grew when a 1948 print sold at auction for $71,500 in 1971 ($ in ); the same print sold for $609,600 in 2006 ($ in ) at a Sotheby's auction.

Creation
In October 1941, Secretary of the Interior Harold Ickes hired Adams for six months to create photographs of lands under the jurisdiction of the Department of the Interior, for use as mural-sized prints for decoration of the department's new Interior Museum. Adams was accompanied by his young son Michael and his best friend Cedric Wright on a long road trip around the west. They came upon the scene while traveling through the Chama River valley toward Española in late afternoon on November 1 (see section "Dating", below); accounts of what transpired differ considerably.

The initial publication of Moonrise was at the end of 1942, with a two-page image in U.S. Camera Annual 1943, having been selected by the "photo judge" of U.S. Camera, Edward Steichen. In that publication, Adams gave this account:

Adams' later accounts were more dramatic. In his autobiography, completed by his assistant and editor Mary Alinder shortly after his 1984 death, the traveling companions encountered a "fantastic scene", a church and cemetery near Hernandez, New Mexico, and pulled to the side of the road. Adams recalled that he yelled at his son Michael and at Wright to "Get this! Get that, for God's sake! We don't have much time!" Desperate to capture the image in the fading light, they scrambled to set up the tripod and camera, knowing that only moments remained before the light was gone.

Adams had given a similar account in his 1983 book Examples: The Making of 40 Photographs

Dating the image
Beaumont Newhall, a photographer, curator and friend of Adams, was curious that Adams did not know the date of the photograph. While Adams remembered that the photograph was taken in the autumn, he had variously given the year as 1940, 1941, and 1942—despite the picture having been published in 1943–1944.

Newhall wondered if the astronomical information in the photograph could provide the answer, so he approached David Elmore of the High Altitude Observatory in Boulder, Colorado. Focusing on the autumn months of 1941 through 1944, Elmore found 36 plausible dates for the image. Elmore determined a probable location and direction for the camera alongside the highway. Using that location information, he then plotted the Moon's apparent position on his computer screen for those dates to find a match. Elmore concluded that Moonrise was taken on October 31, 1941, at 4:03 p.m.
Adams thanked Elmore for determining the date and used that date in several subsequent publications, including his 1983 book Examples: The Making of 40 Photographs that used the date but rounded the time to 4:05 p.m.

Dennis di Cicco of Sky & Telescope magazine read about Elmore's results and tried verifying them. He entered the position, direction, and time into a program that displayed the Moon's position, but the resulting position did not match the Moonrise image. He was intrigued by the discrepancy, and after working intermittently over the next ten years, including a visit to the location, concluded in 1991 "that Adams had been at the edge of the old roadbed, about 50 feet west of the spot on the modern highway that Elmore had identified". His calculations determined that the image was taken at 4:49:20 p.m. on November 1, 1941. He reviewed his calculations with Elmore, who agreed with Di Cicco's result. Elmore had been misled by his computer monitor's distortion with an additional slight discrepancy in Adams' coordinates. In 1981, the IBM PC's CGA display did not have a 1:1 pixel aspect ratio; plotting software would have to compensate for that aspect ratio to make an isotropic plot.

See also
List of photographs considered the most important

Notes

References

External links
Ansel Adams on capturing Moonrise Over Hernandez (Video Footage)
The Market for Ansel Adams and Moonrise, Hernandez, New Mexico
George Eastman House – Moonrise, Hernandez, New Mexico: Bibliographic references and exhibition history
Moonrise, Hernandez, New Mexico at New Mexico Museum of Art
Site of Moonrise, circa 2000
Findagrave Graveyard pictured in Moonrise
http://www.hctc.commnet.edu/artmuseum/anseladams/details/moonrise.html using Elmore's date
Ansel Adams: A Biography by Mary Street Alinder date and ownership

Photographs by Ansel Adams
Photographs of the United States
1941 in New Mexico
1941 works
1941 in art
Works about the Moon
History of Rio Arriba County, New Mexico
1940s photographs
Landscape photographs